Jefferson Tavares da Silva (born 22 November 1989), is a Brazilian footballer who plays as a centre forward for bolivian club Atlético Palmaflor.

Club career

Gol Gohar
He made his debut for Gol Gohar Sirjan in 2nd fixtures of 2019–20 Iran Pro League against Saipa while he substituted in for Kevin Jansen.

References

1989 births
Living people
Brazilian footballers
Expatriate footballers in China
Brazilian expatriate sportspeople in Bolivia
Brazilian expatriate sportspeople in Iran
Association football forwards
Footballers from Rio de Janeiro (city)
Madureira Esporte Clube players
Gol Gohar players
Clube Recreativo e Atlético Catalano players
Club Destroyers players
MC Oujda players